Sde Boker (lit. Herding Field) is a kibbutz in the Negev desert of southern Israel. Best known as the retirement home of Israel's first Prime Minister, David Ben-Gurion, it falls under the jurisdiction of Ramat HaNegev Regional Council.

History
A large agricultural farm or small village existed here in the early Islamic period, from the late 7th century to the early 9th century. Remains of dozens of structures exist, including a mosque near which hundreds of Arabic inscriptions were found.

The modern kibbutz was established on 15 May 1952 by former soldiers, including Yehoshua Cohen who assassinated United Nations envoys Folke Bernadotte and André Sérot in 1948. In 1953 Prime Minister David Ben-Gurion resigned from office and moved to the kibbutz. Although he returned to politics in 1955, he continued to live in the kibbutz until his death in 1973, when he was buried nearby at Midreshet Ben-Gurion alongside his wife Paula Ben-Gurion. Ben-Gurion moved to the kibbutz inspired by his vision of cultivating the Negev desert and building up its surrounding towns such as Yeruham and Dimona. He believed that eventually the Negev would be home to many Jews who would move to Israel, and he felt that Sde Boker was a trailblazer and example for what should follow. His home was later turned into a museum.

In his official writings Ben-Gurion often mused about his efforts at rejuvenating the Negev:

Sde Boker is also well known for its Bedouin tents. In 2014, it was host to the Midburn festival.

On March 27, 2022, Sde Boker was the site of "the Negev Summit" of foreign ministers from the United States, Bahrain, Morocco, the United Arab Emirates, and Egypt.

Gallery

References

External links

.
.

Kibbutzim
Kibbutz Movement
Populated places established in 1952
1952 establishments in Israel